GTV (Good Television), stylized as Gtv, is a Philippine free-to-air television network owned and operated by the Citynet Network Marketing and Productions Inc., a wholly owned subsidiary of GMA Network Inc. It was launched on February 22, 2021, replacing GMA News TV on its flagship station, UHF Channel 27 Metro Manila and its provincial relay stations. It is a sixth overall secondary television brand of GMA Network since its inception in 1995 as Citynet Television. The network produces programmes from studios located at the GMA Network Center, EDSA corner Timog Avenue, Diliman, Quezon City. The network's primary transmitter facility is located at the GMA Tower of Power site, Tandang Sora, Barangay Culiat, Quezon City and it operates Mondays to Thursdays from 5:30 a.m. to 12:15 a.m., Fridays from 5:30 a.m. to 11:45 p.m., and Saturday and Sunday from 5:30 a.m. to 12:00 midnight, as well as on truncated hours during the Paschal Triduum.

History

As GMA News TV (2011–2021) 

GTV was first known as GMA News TV, a channel which primarily focuses on all-news and public service, as part of GMA News and Public Affairs' plans to expand its presence on free-to-air television as well as retaining some lifestyle and public affairs program from its predecessor, QTV/Q Channel 11. The channel was unveiled on February 7, 2011, on 24 Oras, GMA's flagship nightly newscast., The news channel launched on February 28, 2011, with its tagline, Oras-Oras, Alam Ko! (lit. Everytime, I Know).

It launches wide variety of news and public affairs and entertainment-produced programs to serve its audience, such as existing programs that carried over from QTV, including Balitanghali, Live on Q (which rebranded as News TV Live and later News Live), Day Off!, Tonight with Arnold Clavio, and Ang Pinaka, as well as new programs that been launched and introduced to the channel, including Dobol B sa News TV, State of the Nation with Jessica Soho, News to Go, Balita Pilipinas (both Primetime and weekday edition, dubbed as Balita Pilipinas Ngayon), Kape at Balita, News TV Quick Response Team, On Call: Serbisyong Totoo. Ngayon., Bawal ang Pasaway kay Mareng Winnie, Mars, Personalan, Pop Talk, Wagas, Investigative Documentaries, Motorcycle Diaries, Power House, In the Limelight, Reel Time, Front Row, May Tamang Balita and more. The channel became popular to the audience, and just a few months, the channel became The Philippines' No.1 News Channel.

From its launch to 2019, ZOE Broadcasting Network (now under blocktime agreement with ABS-CBN as A2Z after the former's shutdown and legislative franchise denial) served as an originating affiliate and flagship station of GMA News TV, as a result of a blocktime lease agreement between ZOE Broadcasting and GMA's subsidiary Citynet Network Marketing and Productions in 2005, allowing the latter to lease the entire airtime of DZOE-TV 11 Manila, in exchange for upgrading the former's facilities and an off-peak timeslot for its programs on Channel 11 and GMA Network. However, due to increasing lease payments of GMA Network to ZOE Broadcasting which is accompanied with decreased revenues of GMA, the two networks announced on April 24, 2019, that they will terminate the agreement by the end of May 2019. As a result, GMA News TV Manila was reassigned to analog Channel 27, which was being used for digital test broadcast of GMA Network, on June 4. In turn, DTV operations of GMA were transferred on a permanent frequency, UHF Channel 15 (479.143 MHz), which was being used since May 15.

In line with the government's protocol of imposing "Enhanced Community Quarantine" (ECQ, also known as "Luzon Lockdown") due to the COVID-19 pandemic outbreak, GMA News TV temporarily went off air on March 19, 2020 and has returned on air 2 days later, March 21, with limited broadcasting hours, with Dobol B sa News TV as a provisional programming, expands its broadcast (for the first time, wherein the afternoon programming of DZBB was introduced and included in the program lineup) from Mondays to Sundays from 6am to afternoon until the simulcast of 24 Oras (both weekday and weekend edition) and signs-off right after the newscast. On April 13, 2020, the channel resumed its regular primetime programming after 24 Oras, with launching of "New Normal: The Survival Guide", and Power Block: Serbisyong Totoo on Primetime as its provisional primetime blocktime. GMA News TV's programming was fully restored by September 21, 2020.

On November 21, 2020, Sports Interactive Network, (an affiliate news portal of GMA) published an article that the network announce plans for a possible reformat of GMA News TV into a news, sports and variety channel which is similar to the old format of Citynet Television and QTV. The plans were unveiled following GNTV's gradual shift away from its original news and public affairs channel format and towards "general" entertainment and sports since September 2020, which includes acquisition of broadcast rights to NCAA and PSL games (which is the main reason of GTV's rebrand), a simulcast of its sister digital channel Hallypop (until it cancelled in the fourth quarter of 2020), and additional entertainment programs from its mother station GMA Network due to increase of its commercial load. These changes were embattled by mounting viewer criticisms, notably during the country was hit by Typhoon Goni (Rolly), where entertainment programs were aired instead of pre-empting them for round-the-clock news coverage.

As GTV (2021–present)
On February 9, 2021, GMA Network announced that its sister channel, GMA News TV, would be relaunched as GTV on February 22, with the teaser featuring a voice over said that the channel will have "The big change is about to happen; and it's gonna be GOOD!".

Its presentation was dramatically overhauled on the same date of its relaunch as GTV.

According to some of GMA executives in their media conference which took place in days before GTV launched, they took one year to plan on relaunching the channel as GTV due to the needs of its viewers and more variety for teenager and "young-at-heart" viewers. While retaining most in-house programs of its predecessor, GTV carries news and public affairs with the addition of entertainment, variety, lifestyle and sports programs which is similar to the old format of what Citynet Television and QTV/Q had done before. The international counterpart of GTV's predecessor is still operational even after February 28, 2021, a decade after its original domestic counterpart was launched. Unlike its predecessor, the channel is using Taglish language (even the programming is in full Filipino language).

On February 27, 2023, GTV began broadcasting in true 16:9 aspect ratio.

Programming

GTV's programming includes game telecasts of the NCAA Philippines; and the entirety of its predecessor's existing programming such as weekly public affairs series and daily newscasts (including Balitanghali, State of the Nation, Regional TV News, the TV simulcasts of Super Radyo DZBB programs (under the new name Dobol B TV) and simulcast airing of 24 Oras, 24 Oras Weekend and Saksi, along with movie blocks, dramas, game shows and animated series similar to its sister channel GMA, as well as sports programs. In addition, GTV is also slated to air some classic anime that used to air on GMA.

The channel is mainly targeted for youth audiences.

Availability

GTV is seen via regular free-to-air television on Channel 27 in Metro Manila, Cebu and Davao and 24 other regional stations nationwide. Aside from GTV's main analog signal, it is a must-carry channel on all cable and satellite TV providers nationwide. The network is also available as a digital subchannel through GMA's main digital transmitters in Metro Manila, Ilocos Sur, Baguio, Batangas, Naga, Legazpi, Cebu, Tacloban, Iloilo, Bacolod, Davao, Cagayan de Oro, General Santos and Zamboanga.

See also
Hallypop
GMA Network
Super Radyo DZBB 594 kHz
Citynet Television
Pinoy Hits
ZOE Broadcasting Network
A2Z

References

External links
 

GTV (Philippine TV network)
GMA Network (company) channels
Filipino-language television stations
Television channels and stations established in 2021
Television networks in the Philippines
2021 establishments in the Philippines